Brigadier D. C. K. Amenu was a Ghanaian military officer and a former Chief of Army Staff of the Ghana Army. He served as Chief of Army Staff from November 1968 to August 1969.

References

Ghanaian military personnel
Chiefs of Army Staff (Ghana)
Year of birth missing